Engkuni is a village in West Kutai, East Kalimantan, Indonesia. The village is near Idan river and Goa Batu waterfall.

References 

West Kutai Regency
Villages in Indonesia
Populated places in East Kalimantan